IJsbrand is a Dutch male given name of late Old Dutch or early Middle Dutch origins. The first syllable, "eis" (or ijs/ys), is derived from the old West Germanic word for iron. The second syllable, "brand" (or brandt), means fire but was traditionally also used as kenning for sword. The NRC birth registry thus suggests the meaning "iron sword".

The name is at least as old as the 12th century, when it was a distinguished name for the Lords of Haarlem. After it had caught on as a common given name, IJsbrand remained popular throughout Dutch history and up to the present day.

According to the figures of the Sociale Verzekeringsbank, the organization that implements national insurance schemes in the Netherlands, the year 2009 saw the name IJsbrand given to 4 newborn boys in The Netherlands; in the same year the alternative spelling Ysbrand had a count of 5. The Meertens Institute database of given names in the Netherlands reports a total of 1687 people with the spelling IJsbrand and 321 with the spelling Ysbrand as first or middle name, with other spellings occurring with 25 or fewer counts.

Notable IJsbrands
 IJsbrand Chardon (1961-), Dutch equestrian
 IJsbrand van Diemerbroeck (1609–1674), Dutch physician and anatomist
 IJsbrand Godske (1626-1689), Governor of the Cape Colony (South Africa) from 1672 to 1676
  (1743–1812), Dutch head of state for two weeks in 1796 under the Batavian Republic.
 IJsbrand van Eldik (1999-)
 IJsbrand Haagsma (1966-)

References

External links
 Dutch male given names 2009
 Meertens Institute documentation of IJsbrand (Dutch language)

Dutch masculine given names